The Latin Grammy Award for Song of the Year is an honor presented annually at the Latin Grammy Awards, a ceremony that recognizes excellence, creates a wider awareness of cultural diversity and contributions of Latin recording artists in the United States and internationally. The award is given to the songwriters of new songs containing at least 51% of lyrics in Spanish or Portuguese language. Instrumental songs or a new version of a previously recorded track are not eligible. Due to the increasing musical changes in the industry, from 2012 the category includes 10 nominees, according to a restructuration made by the academy for the four general categories: Album of the Year, Record of the Year, Best New Artist and Song of the Year.

Seventeen awarded songs have also earned the Latin Grammy for Record of the Year, which unlike this category, is given to songs that were released on a promotional level, and the prize is given to the performer, producer and audio engineer. The exceptions to this were in 2000, 2009 and 2013 when "Corazón Espinado" by Santana featuring Maná, "No Hay Nadie Como Tú" by Calle 13 featuring Café Tacvba and "Vivir Mi Vida" by Marc Anthony, respectively, received the award without a nomination for Song of the Year.

Alejandro Sanz is the most awarded songwriter in the category with four wins out of ten nominations. Andrés Castro, Jorge Drexler, Shakira and Carlos Vives have received the award twice. In 2017, Colombian artist Maluma became the first songwriter to have three nominated songs in the same year, with "Chantaje", "Felices los 4", and "Vente Pa' Ca". Claudia Brant, Angie Chirino, Joy Huerta (of the Mexican band Jesse & Joy), Natalia Lafourcade, Shakira, and Mónica Vélez are the only female writers to be awarded. The current holders, as of the 2022 ceremony are Jorge Drexler, Pablo Drexler, Víctor Martínez & C. Tangana for the song "Tocarte".

Recipients
An asterisk (*) indicates this recording also won Record of the Year.

2000s

2010s

2020s

 Each year is linked to the article about the Latin Grammy Awards held that year.
 The performing artist is only listed but does not receive the award.
 Showing the name of the songwriter(s), the nominated song and in parentheses the performer's name(s).

See also
 Grammy Award for Song of the Year

References

General
  Note: User must select the "General Field" category as the genre under the search feature.

Specific

External links
Official site of the Latin Grammy Awards

 
Song awards
Song of the Year
Songwriting awards